Old Ashippun is an unincorporated community located in the town of Ashippun, Dodge County, Wisconsin, United States.

Notes

Unincorporated communities in Dodge County, Wisconsin
Unincorporated communities in Wisconsin